The following highways are numbered 37:

Australia
 Newcastle Inner City Bypass
 Nubeena Road (TAS)

Canada
 Alberta Highway 37
 British Columbia Highway 37
 Winnipeg Route 37
 Ontario Highway 37
 Saskatchewan Highway 37
 Yukon Highway 37

Czech Republic
 I/37 Highway; Czech: Silnice I/37

Iceland
 Route 37 (Iceland)

India
 National Highway 37 (India)

Iran
 Road 37

Italy
 Strada statale 37 del Maloja

Japan
 Japan National Route 37

Korea, South
 Second Jungbu Expressway
 National Route 37
Gukjido 37

New Zealand
 New Zealand State Highway 37

Poland 
  National road 37

United Kingdom
 A37 (Great Britain)
 A37 (Coleraine-Limavady, Northern Ireland)
 A37 (Cullaville, Northern Ireland)

United States
 Interstate 37
 Interstate 37 (Illinois) (former proposal)
 U.S. Route 37 (former)
 Alabama State Route 37
 Arkansas Highway 37
 California State Route 37
 County Route J37 (California)
 Connecticut Route 37
 Delaware Route 37
 Florida State Road 37
 Georgia State Route 37
 Hawaii Route 37
 Idaho State Highway 37
 Illinois Route 37
 Indiana State Road 37
 Iowa Highway 37
 K-37 (Kansas highway)
 Kentucky Route 37 (former)
 Louisiana Highway 37
 Maine State Route 37
 Maryland Route 37 (former)
 Massachusetts Route 37
 Massachusetts Route C37 (former)
 M-37 (Michigan highway)
 Minnesota State Highway 37
 County Road 37 (Cass County, Minnesota)
 County Road 37 (Ramsey County, Minnesota)
 County Road 37 (St. Louis County, Minnesota)
 Mississippi Highway 37
 Missouri Route 37
 Montana Highway 37
 Nebraska Highway 37 (former)
 Nevada State Route 37 (former)
 New Jersey Route 37
 County Route 37 (Bergen County, New Jersey)
 County Route S37 (Bergen County, New Jersey)
 County Route 37 (Monmouth County, New Jersey)
 New Mexico State Road 37
 New York State Route 37
 County Route 37 (Broome County, New York)
 County Route 37 (Chautauqua County, New York)
 County Route 37 (Chemung County, New York)
 County Route 37 (Chenango County, New York)
 County Route 37 (Delaware County, New York)
 County Route 37 (Dutchess County, New York)
 County Route 37 (Erie County, New York)
 County Route 37 (Franklin County, New York)
 County Route 37 (Jefferson County, New York)
 County Route 37 (Oneida County, New York)
 County Route 37 (Ontario County, New York)
 County Route 37 (Orleans County, New York)
 County Route 37 (Oswego County, New York)
 County Route 37 (Putnam County, New York)
 County Route 37 (Rensselaer County, New York)
 County Route 37 (Rockland County, New York)
 County Route 37 (Schenectady County, New York)
 County Route 37 (St. Lawrence County, New York)
 County Route 37 (Steuben County, New York)
 County Route 37 (Suffolk County, New York)
 County Route 37 (Washington County, New York)
 North Carolina Highway 37
 North Dakota Highway 37
 Ohio State Route 37
 Oklahoma State Highway 37
 Oregon Route 37
 Pennsylvania Route 37 (former)
 Rhode Island Route 37
 South Carolina Highway 37
 South Dakota Highway 37
 Tennessee State Route 37
 Texas State Highway 37
 Texas State Highway Loop 37 (former)
 Texas State Highway Spur 37
 Farm to Market Road 37
 Texas Park Road 37
 Utah State Route 37
 Virginia State Route 37
 Virginia State Route 37 (former)
 West Virginia Route 37
 Wisconsin Highway 37
 Wyoming Highway 37

Territories
 Puerto Rico Highway 37
 U.S. Virgin Islands Highway 37

See also
A37#Roads
List of highways numbered 37A